Sarah Theresa Hudson  is an American pop singer-songwriter, and creator of the club-pop music project Ultraviolet Sound.

Music career

2004–2006: Debut album
Hudson's previous record label, S-Curve Records, folded before her debut album, Naked Truth (2004), was officially released. Collaborators include Desmond Child, Eric Bazilian, Billy Mann, Ozzy Osbourne and Aerosmith vocalist Steven Tyler. In conjunction with the album, Hudson was featured in Interview, Women's Wear Daily, YM, Seventeen, Teen Vogue and Elle.

2007–2011: Ultraviolet Sound
Work began in early 2007 on Hudson's new "club pop" music project under the name Ultraviolet Sound. The group, also known as UVS, released their first full-length record, O.C.D. (Obsessive Compulsive Dancing), in April 2009 independently. The band secured sponsorship of O.C.D from Adidas Originals and garnered a total of 135,000 downloads. UVS released another album worldwide in 2011 entitled "Ultraviolet Sound". Their first single "Suck My Kiss" was released digitally on iTunes along with three remixes. Followed by the release of their second single "Girl Talk" which was the #1 release at Top 40 radio from an independent label in 2011, playing on over 50 Top 40 stations. In 2012, they released a collaboration with DJ Kill The Noise called "Dying". UVS played a 35-city US tour with Family Force 5, shows with DJs Kill The Noise, Treasure Fingers, Ludachrist, SebastiAn, Kavinsky and more. They also played several one-off shows with Lady Gaga, a SXSW performance on a bill with Robyn, N.E.R.D, Katy Perry and shows with many other top artists. They received multiple posts from celebrity blogger Perez Hilton, and heard their cover of "Two of Hearts" in rotation on top dance stations around the country. Ultraviolet Sound took their music international in March 2010 with a 20-date U.K. tour. Sarah had a featuring and co-write on EDM artist Brillz's record called "Fuzzy Peach" and EDM artists Kill The Noise and Brillz's record "Saturn" which was released on Skrillex's label OWSLA, featured in Rolling Stone and continues to be played by high-profile DJs around the world.

Present: Songwriting and a solo project
Sarah Hudson is currently signed to Prescription Songs/AAM as a songwriter. A song she co-wrote with Katy Perry, Dr. Luke, Max Martin and Cirkut entitled "Dark Horse" became Perry's third single off her album, Prism. "Dark Horse" has been a commercial success, charting at number one on the US Billboard Hot 100. The song topped the charts for four weeks straight and has sold 7.9 million copies so far, making it one of the top-selling digital singles of all time. Sarah also co-wrote "Black Widow" by Iggy Azalea and Rita Ora which has recently been certified 2× platinum by the RIAA and peaked at number three on the US Billboard Hot 100 charts. Hudson has currently penned "Get On Your Knees" by Nicki Minaj featuring Ariana Grande, "Swish Swish" by Katy Perry & Nicki Minaj, "The Feeling" by Justin Bieber featuring Halsey, "Banshee" by Santigold, "San Francisco" by 5 Seconds of Summer and many more cuts on the hit records of today. On April 7, 2017, Hudson released a solo EP entitled, "Songs from the Sea".

Television career
Hudson was featured on Frontline in its report "The Way The Music Died." She has also appeared on a Season 1 episode of Project Runway, during a challenge where the contestants had to design a rocker fashion with which she would portray her image. She was touted as an "up and coming rock star".

Discography

Albums
 2004: Naked Truth
 2009: O.C.D. (Obsessive Compulsive Dancing) (as Ultraviolet Sound)
 2011: Ultraviolet Sound (as Ultraviolet Sound)

Extended plays
 2007: Fast, Cheap and Out of Control (as Ultraviolet Sound)
 2017: Songs from the Sea (as Sarah Hudson)

Singles
 2005: "Girl on the Verge" (as Sarah Hudson)
 2011: "Suck My Kiss" (as Ultraviolet Sound)
 2011: "Girl Talk" (as Ultraviolet Sound)
 2012: "Neon Child" (as Ultraviolet Sound)

Music videos
 2005: "Girl on the Verge" (as Sarah Hudson)
 2009: "Gimme My Electro" (as Ultraviolet Sound)
 2011: "Suck My Kiss" (as Ultraviolet Sound)
 2011: "Girl Talk" (as Ultraviolet Sound)
 2011: "Video Megamix" (as Ultraviolet Sound)

Songwriting credits
{| class="wikitable plainrowheaders" style="text-align:center;"
|-
!scope="col"| Year
!scope="col"| Title
!scope="col"| Artist(s)
!scope="col"| Album
!scope="col"| Co-writer(s)
|-
| 2007
! scope="row"| "Unlove You"
| Ashley Tisdale
| Headstrong
| Shelly Peiken, Guy Roche
|-
| 2008
! scope="row"| "Miss Boombox"
| rowspan="2"| Jeffree Star
| Cupcakes Taste Like Violence EP
| By Jeffrey Steininger Jr., And Sami Diament
|-
| 2009
! scope="row"| "Beauty Killer"
| Beauty Killer
| Jeffrey Steininger Jr., Sami Diament
|-
| 2013
! scope="row"| "Dark Horse"
| Katy Perry
| Prism
| Katheryn Hudson, Lukasz Gottwald, Karl Sandberg, Henry Walter, Jordan Houston
|-
| rowspan="6"| 2014
! scope="row"| "Black Widow"
| Iggy Azalea
| The New Classic
| Amethyst Kelly, Katheryn Hudson, Mikkel Eriksen, Tor Hermansen, Benjamin Levin
|-
! scope="row"| "Speak in Tongues"
| rowspan="4"| Ferras
| rowspan="4"| Ferras EP
| Ferras Alquasi, Scott Hoffman, Mathieu Jomphe Lepine
|-
! scope="row"| "Champagne"
| Ferras Alquasi, Jonathan Asher, Adam Francis
|-
! scope="row"| "King of Sabotage"
| Ferras Alquasi, Sami Diament, Kevin Kadish, Nico Hartikainen
|-
! scope="row"| "Legends Never Die"
| Ferras Alquasi, Greg Wells
|-
! scope="row"| "Get on Your Knees"
| Nicki Minaj
| The Pinkprint
| Onika Maraj, Katheryn Hudson, Chloe Angelides, Lukasz Gottwald, Henry Walter, Jacob Kasher Hindlin
|-
| rowspan="4"| 2015
! scope="row"| "Born to Love U"
| Jussie Smollett
| Empire: OST
| Ferras Alquasi, Justin Tranter, Talay Riley, Teal Douville
|-
! scope="row"| "San Francisco"
| 5 Seconds of Summer
| Sounds Good Feels Good
| Calum Hood, Michael Clifford, John Feldmann, Bonnie Mckee
|-
! scope="row"| "The Feeling"
| Justin Bieber
| Purpose
| Justin Bieber, Julia Michaels, Sonny Moore, Ian Kirkpatrick, Clarence Coffee Jr.
|-
! scope="row"| "Every Day Is a Holiday"
| Katy Perry
| 
| Katy Perry, Adam Dyment, Hal Ritson
|-
| rowspan="5"| 2016
! scope="row"| "Banshee"
| Santigold
| 99¢
| Santi White, Patrik Berger, Catherine Dennis, Jonathan Hill
|-
! scope="row"| "Drown Me Out"
| rowspan="2"| Andy Black
| rowspan="2"| The Shadow Side
| Andrew Biersack, Ashton Irwin, John Feldmann, Bonnie McKee
|-
! scope="row"| "The Void"
| Andew Biersack, Zakk Cervini, Matthew Pauling, John Feldmann, Bonnie McKee
|-
! scope="row"| "Queen of Swords"
| Idina Menzel
| Idina
| Idina Menzel, Ferras Alquasi, Greg Wells
|-
! scope="row"| "Cross Your Heart"
| LIZ
| Cross Your Heart
| Elizabeth Abrams, Jesse St. John Geller
|-
| rowspan="15"| 2017
! scope="row"| "XXpensive"
| Erika Jayne
| 
| Erika Girardi, Ferras Alquasi, Jesse St. John Geller, Marc Sibley, Nathan Cunningham
|-
! scope="row"| "Babygirl"
| Charli XCX
| Number 1 Angel
| Charlotte Aitchison, Amanda Lucille Warner, Jonathan Hill, Anna-Catherine Hartley
|-
! scope="row"| "Swish Swish"
| Katy Perry
| Witness
| Katheryn Hudson, Adam Dyment, Paul Sledge, Onika Maraj, Brittany Talia Hazzard
|-
! scope="row"| "Genesis"
| Dua Lipa
| Dua Lipa
| Dua Lipa, Andreas Schuller, Clarence Coffee Jr.
|-
! scope="row"| "Hey Hey Hey"
| rowspan="8"| Katy Perry
| rowspan="8"| Witness
| Katy Perry, Max Martin, Alexander Payami, Sia Furler
|-
! scope="row"| "Mind Maze"
| Katy Perry, Corin Riddick, Megan James
|-
! scope="row"| "Miss Your More"
| Katy Perry, Corin Riddick, Megan James
|-
! scope="row"| "Tsunami"
| Katy Perry, Michael Williams, Marcus Bell, Mia Moretti
|-
! scope="row"| "Bigger Than Me"
| Katy Perry, Corin Riddick, Megan James
|-
! scope="row"| "Pendulum"
| Katy Perry, Jeff Bhasker
|-
! scope="row"| "Dance with the Devil"
| Katy Perry, Felix Snow
|-
! scope="row"| "Act My Age"
| Katheryn Hudson, Tinashe Fazakerley, Mark Crew
|-
! scope="row"| "Two Fux"
| Adam Lambert
| 
| Adam Lambert, Ferras Alquasi, Leroy Clampitt, Trey Campbell
|-
! scope="row"| "Come at Me"
| Dev
| I Only See You When I'm Dreamin'''
| Amanda Lucille Warner, Rachel Keen, Frederik Gibson
|-
! scope="row"| "Fantasy"
| Superfruit
| Future Friends| Jonathan Hill, Sophie Xeon, Daniel Eisner Harle, Amber Liu
|-
| rowspan="12"| 2018
! scope="row"| "Dust"
| The Neighbourhood
| Hard to Imagine EP| Jesse Rutherford, Jeremy Freedman, Zach Abels, Mikey Margott, Brandon Fried, Lars Stalfors, Jesse St. John Geller
|-
! scope="row"| "Something's Gotta Give"
| Camila Cabello
| Camila| Camila Cabello, James Abrahart, Jesse St. John Geller, Adam Feeney, Alexander Schwartz, Joseph Khajadourian
|-
! scope="row"| "Heaven"
| The Neighbourhood
| Hard to Imagine EP| Jesse Rutherford, Jeremy Freedman, Zach Abels, Mikey Margott, Brandon Fried, Lars Stalfors, Jesse St. John Geller, Dylan Brady, Timothy Price, Antonina Armato, Daniel Parra
|-
! scope="row"| "Coming Back Around"
| Ferras
| 
| Ferras Alquasi, Alexandra Hughes, Scott Hoffman, Greg Wells
|-
! scope="row"| "Blue"
| The Neighbourhood
| The Neighbourhood| Jesse Rutherford, Jeremy Freedman, Zach Abels, Mikey Margott, Brandon Fried, Lars Stalfors, Jesse St. John Geller, Dylan Brady
|-
! scope="row"| "Salt"
| Tinashe
| Joyride| Tinashe Kachingwe, Kenneth Coby, Keiran Lasker, Clarence Coffee Jr.
|-
! scope="row"| "Super Duper Nova"
| LIZ
| 
| Elizabeth Abrams, Jesse St. John Geller, Leroy Clampitt
|-
! scope="row"| "Palo Santo"
| rowspan="2"| Years & Years
| rowspan="2"| Palo Santo| Oliver Thornton
|-
! scope="row"| "Karma"
| Oliver Thornton, Daniel Traynor, Clarence Coffee Jr.
|-
! scope="row"| "Retrograded"
| The Knocks
| New York Narcotic| Benjamin Ruttner, James Patterson, Kaelyn Behr, Evan Kidd Bogart
|-
! scope="row"| "Cowboy"
| Alma
| Have You Seen Her?| Alma-Sofia Miettinen, Justin Tranter, Michael Tucker, Eren Cannata
|-
! scope="row"| "The National Manthem"
| Little Mix
| LM5| Leigh-Anne Pinnock, Jade Thirlwall, James Abrahart, Michael Woods, Kevin White
|-
| rowspan="2"| 2020
! scope="row"| "Physical"
| rowspan="2"| Dua Lipa
| rowspan="2"| Future Nostalgia| Clarence Coffee Jr, Dua Lipa, Jason Evigan
|-
! scope="row"| "Levitating"
| Clarence Coffee Jr, Dua Lipa, Stephen Kozmeniuk,   "DaBaby" 
|-
| rowspan="2" | 2022
! scope="row"| "Mr. Percocet"
| Noah Cyrus
| That Hardest Part| Noah Cyrus, Jason Evigan, Peter Harding 
|-
! scope="row"| "Bound"
|Key
|Gasoline
| Bram Inscore, Dale Anthoni, Manu Rios, IMLAY
|}

FilmographyFrontline (2004)Project Runway (2005)Phineas and Ferb the Movie: Candace Against the Universe'' (2020) - voice of Ernox, singer of "Girls Day Out"

References

Notes

External links
 Ultraviolet Sound
 PBS Frontline page for "The Way the Music Died"
 Ultraviolet Sound at Odds On Records

American dance musicians
Singers from Los Angeles
Hudson family (show business)
21st-century American singers
21st-century American women singers
American women in electronic music
1984 births
Living people